Thomas Mignone is an American feature film, streaming media, commercial, and music video director, and screenwriter. He is best known for directing and writing the dark drama On the Doll and The Latin From Manhattan and for directing  conceptual music videos and live concerts for various hard rock and heavy metal artists.

Feature films 
Throughout 2022 Mignone has been directing The Latin From Manhattan, based on the life of Vanessa Del Rio as the World's First Latina adult film star and featuring actors Jesse Metcalfe, Esai Morales, Drea De Matteo, Taryn Manning, David Proval, Elizabeth Rodriguez.

In 2010, Mignone wrote and directed the feature film On the Doll starring Brittany Snow, Josh Janowicz, Candice Accola, Angela Sarafyan, Clayne Crawford, Shanna Collins, James Russo and Theresa Russell. The title refers to the phrase "Show me on the doll where he touched you", which is often asked of children who have been victimized by molesters. On The Doll premiered at the Austin Film Festival and was also selected to screen at the 25th Anniversary of the Avignon Film Festival in France, Cinequest in San Jose, Ft. Lauderdale International Film Festival, and the 15th Annual Oldenburg International Film Festival in Germany. The film's soundtrack features new music from The Crystal Method, and an original score from former Tool bassist Paul D'Amour.

In October 2012, Mignone was one of several international filmmakers selected by the Cinequest Film Festival to direct and produce a film in concurrence with their partnership with The Tech Museum of Innovation. Additional feature film projects include Otep: Live Confrontation Concert Documentary, Slipknot: Welcome To Our Neighborhood, Satanika, a live-action version of the comic-book female anti-hero created by multi-platinum rock musician Glenn Danzig, and Ursa Minor. Mignone also helped develop the TV series The Deuce, which revolves around organized crime-controlled Times Square during the '70s and '80s. and has been selected to direct the new feature film The Thrill Is On based on the life of legendary blues guitarist BB King starring Wendell Pierce. Mignone is currently developing several new feature films and streaming series.

Music videos 
Mignone's music video for Mudvayne's hit song "Dig" won the first MTV2 Award and was the first music video to feature heavy metal  artists in vibrant, brightly lit and color-saturated images, in sharp contrast to the dark, shadowy videos typical of the genre. His video for Sepultura's "Roots Bloody Roots" received the Video Of The Year Award from Kerrang! Magazine. It was filmed in Salvador, Brazil, and was the first music video to contrast the hard rock group's intense performance with images of capoiera dancers, timbalada musicians, and other traditional Brazilian scenes. In addition to hard rock and heavy metal artists, Mignone has also directed hit videos for alternative music artists such as Toadies, Tonic, Concrete Blonde, Lit, and others. He has directed hip hop and urban music videos for artists such as Kool Keith, Digable Planets, and Rahsaan Patterson. Mignone's videos are characterized by strong narrative conceptual storylines, elaborate and distinct color-correction palettes, and many times include feature film actors in lead roles, including Vincent Gallo, Denise Richards, Michael Rooker from the cult film Henry: Portrait of a Serial Killer, Peter Stormare, and Navi Rawat. Mignone lives and works in Los Angeles, and continues directing feature films and music videos. Recent videos include Existo Vulgore for Morbid Angel, Bullet Proof Heart for Miss Derringer featuring vocalist and acclaimed Los Angeles artist Elizabeth McGrath, the MTV #1 Buzz Clip video Lay Me Down for the Dirty Heads featuring vocalist Rome from the band Sublime With Rome, and Wings Of Feathers And Wax for American heavy metal supergroup Killer Be Killed featuring Soulfly/ex-Sepultura vocalist and guitarist Max Cavalera, The Dillinger Escape Plan co-vocalist and guitarist Greg Puciato, Mastodon bassist and co-vocalist Troy Sanders and former The Mars Volta drummer Dave Elitch. Mignone has also directed numerous artists during live concerts such as MTV's Rock Am Ring, Ozzfest, Vans Warped Tour, Tattoo The Earth, and Dynamo Open Air festivals.

Filmography 
2003: Ozzfest US Live Concert Tour
2005: Slipknot Rock am Ring Europe Concert Tour
2009: Otep Live Confrontation
2010: On the Doll
2011: Slipknot Welcome to Our Neighborhood feat. Wait & Bleed, Surfacing, and Spit It Out
2016: The Deuce (TV series)
2017: American Whore (TV series)
2019: Splash the Glass (streaming series)
2022: The Latin From Manhattan (feature film)

References

External links 
 
 

American music video directors
Living people
Year of birth missing (living people)
American film directors
American film producers